The 1905 Purdue Boilermakers football team was an American football team that represented Purdue University during the 1905 Western Conference football season. In their first season under head coach Albert E. Herrnstein, the Boilermakers compiled a 6–1–1 record, finished in fourth place in the Big Nine Conference with a 1–1–1 record against conference opponents, and outscored all opponents by a total of 177 to 30. Homer L. Thomas was the team captain.

Schedule

References

Purdue
Purdue Boilermakers football seasons
Purdue Boilermakers football